The 2001–02 Vancouver Canucks season was the team's 32nd in the National Hockey League (NHL).

Offseason

Regular season
The Canucks led the NHL in scoring, with 254 goals for.

Final standings

Playoffs

Schedule and results

Regular season

|- align="center" bgcolor="#FFBBBB"
|1||L||October 4, 2001||4–5 || align="left"|  Chicago Blackhawks (2001–02) ||0–1–0–0 || 
|- align="center" bgcolor="#FFBBBB"
|2||L||October 6, 2001||1–4 || align="left"|  Detroit Red Wings (2001–02) ||0–2–0–0 || 
|- align="center" bgcolor="#FFBBBB"
|3||L||October 9, 2001||4–5 || align="left"| @ Colorado Avalanche (2001–02) ||0–3–0–0 || 
|- align="center" bgcolor="#CCFFCC" 
|4||W||October 11, 2001||4–1 || align="left"| @ Dallas Stars (2001–02) ||1–3–0–0 || 
|- align="center" bgcolor="#CCFFCC" 
|5||W||October 13, 2001||4–0 || align="left"|  Colorado Avalanche (2001–02) ||2–3–0–0 || 
|- align="center" 
|6||T||October 16, 2001||2–2 OT|| align="left"|  Florida Panthers (2001–02) ||2–3–1–0 || 
|- align="center" bgcolor="#FFBBBB"
|7||L||October 18, 2001||5–6 || align="left"|  Toronto Maple Leafs (2001–02) ||2–4–1–0 || 
|- align="center" bgcolor="#FFBBBB"
|8||L||October 20, 2001||2–5 || align="left"| @ Phoenix Coyotes (2001–02) ||2–5–1–0 || 
|- align="center" bgcolor="#FFBBBB"
|9||L||October 21, 2001||1–3 || align="left"| @ Mighty Ducks of Anaheim (2001–02) ||2–6–1–0 || 
|- align="center" bgcolor="#CCFFCC" 
|10||W||October 23, 2001||4–2 || align="left"|  Nashville Predators (2001–02) ||3–6–1–0 || 
|- align="center" bgcolor="#FFBBBB"
|11||L||October 25, 2001||1–4 || align="left"| @ Colorado Avalanche (2001–02) ||3–7–1–0 || 
|- align="center" bgcolor="#FFBBBB"
|12||L||October 27, 2001||2–3 || align="left"| @ Edmonton Oilers (2001–02) ||3–8–1–0 || 
|- align="center" bgcolor="#CCFFCC" 
|13||W||October 30, 2001||3–1 || align="left"|  Columbus Blue Jackets (2001–02) ||4–8–1–0 || 
|-

|- align="center" bgcolor="#CCFFCC" 
|14||W||November 1, 2001||4–0 || align="left"|  Montreal Canadiens (2001–02) ||5–8–1–0 || 
|- align="center" bgcolor="#FFBBBB"
|15||L||November 3, 2001||1–5 || align="left"| @ San Jose Sharks (2001–02) ||5–9–1–0 || 
|- align="center" bgcolor="#CCFFCC" 
|16||W||November 6, 2001||3–2 || align="left"| @ Columbus Blue Jackets (2001–02) ||6–9–1–0 || 
|- align="center" bgcolor="#FFBBBB"
|17||L||November 8, 2001||1–3 || align="left"| @ St. Louis Blues (2001–02) ||6–10–1–0 || 
|- align="center" bgcolor="#FFBBBB"
|18||L||November 9, 2001||1–3 || align="left"| @ Chicago Blackhawks (2001–02) ||6–11–1–0 || 
|- align="center" bgcolor="#CCFFCC" 
|19||W||November 11, 2001||5–0 || align="left"| @ Minnesota Wild (2001–02) ||7–11–1–0 || 
|- align="center" bgcolor="#CCFFCC" 
|20||W||November 13, 2001||3–2 || align="left"|  Chicago Blackhawks (2001–02) ||8–11–1–0 || 
|- align="center" bgcolor="#CCFFCC" 
|21||W||November 15, 2001||2–1 || align="left"|  St. Louis Blues (2001–02) ||9–11–1–0 || 
|- align="center" 
|22||T||November 17, 2001||2–2 OT|| align="left"|  Edmonton Oilers (2001–02) ||9–11–2–0 || 
|- align="center" bgcolor="#FFBBBB"
|23||L||November 20, 2001||0–3 || align="left"| @ Ottawa Senators (2001–02) ||9–12–2–0 || 
|- align="center" bgcolor="#CCFFCC" 
|24||W||November 21, 2001||4–1 || align="left"| @ Pittsburgh Penguins (2001–02) ||10–12–2–0 || 
|- align="center" bgcolor="#FFBBBB"
|25||L||November 23, 2001||2–3 || align="left"| @ Boston Bruins (2001–02) ||10–13–2–0 || 
|- align="center" bgcolor="#CCFFCC" 
|26||W||November 25, 2001||4–1 || align="left"| @ Philadelphia Flyers (2001–02) ||11–13–2–0 || 
|- align="center" bgcolor="#FFBBBB"
|27||L||November 27, 2001||1–2 || align="left"| @ Minnesota Wild (2001–02) ||11–14–2–0 || 
|- align="center" 
|28||T||November 28, 2001||3–3 OT|| align="left"| @ Chicago Blackhawks (2001–02) ||11–14–3–0 || 
|- align="center" bgcolor="#FFBBBB"
|29||L||November 30, 2001||2–5 || align="left"|  Colorado Avalanche (2001–02) ||11–15–3–0 || 
|-

|- align="center" bgcolor="#FFBBBB"
|30||L||December 2, 2001||2–4 || align="left"|  Dallas Stars (2001–02) ||11–16–3–0 || 
|- align="center" bgcolor="#CCFFCC" 
|31||W||December 6, 2001||3–2 || align="left"|  Mighty Ducks of Anaheim (2001–02) ||12–16–3–0 || 
|- align="center" bgcolor="#FFBBBB"
|32||L||December 8, 2001||3–5 || align="left"|  San Jose Sharks (2001–02) ||12–17–3–0 || 
|- align="center" 
|33||T||December 10, 2001||1–1 OT|| align="left"|  Tampa Bay Lightning (2001–02) ||12–17–4–0 || 
|- align="center" bgcolor="#CCFFCC" 
|34||W||December 12, 2001||1–0 OT|| align="left"| @ Mighty Ducks of Anaheim (2001–02) ||13–17–4–0 || 
|- align="center" bgcolor="#FFBBBB"
|35||L||December 13, 2001||3–6 || align="left"| @ Los Angeles Kings (2001–02) ||13–18–4–0 || 
|- align="center" bgcolor="#CCFFCC" 
|36||W||December 15, 2001||3–0 || align="left"|  Detroit Red Wings (2001–02) ||14–18–4–0 || 
|- align="center" bgcolor="#FFBBBB"
|37||L||December 19, 2001||1–4 || align="left"| @ Detroit Red Wings (2001–02) ||14–19–4–0 || 
|- align="center" bgcolor="#FFBBBB"
|38||L||December 20, 2001||2–6 || align="left"| @ Nashville Predators (2001–02) ||14–20–4–0 || 
|- align="center" bgcolor="#FFBBBB"
|39||L||December 22, 2001||1–2 || align="left"|  Minnesota Wild (2001–02) ||14–21–4–0 || 
|- align="center" bgcolor="#CCFFCC" 
|40||W||December 27, 2001||4–2 || align="left"|  Calgary Flames (2001–02) ||15–21–4–0 || 
|- align="center" bgcolor="#CCFFCC" 
|41||W||December 29, 2001||4–2 || align="left"|  New Jersey Devils (2001–02) ||16–21–4–0 || 
|- align="center" bgcolor="#FFBBBB"
|42||L||December 31, 2001||1–2 || align="left"|  Philadelphia Flyers (2001–02) ||16–22–4–0 || 
|-

|- align="center" bgcolor="#CCFFCC" 
|43||W||January 3, 2002||5–2 || align="left"|  Montreal Canadiens (2001–02) ||17–22–4–0 || 
|- align="center" bgcolor="#CCFFCC" 
|44||W||January 5, 2002||4–3 || align="left"| @ Edmonton Oilers (2001–02) ||18–22–4–0 || 
|- align="center" bgcolor="#FFBBBB"
|45||L||January 8, 2002||2–3 || align="left"| @ Buffalo Sabres (2001–02) ||18–23–4–0 || 
|- align="center" bgcolor="#FF6F6F"
|46||OTL||January 9, 2002||4–5 OT|| align="left"| @ Detroit Red Wings (2001–02) ||18–23–4–1 || 
|- align="center" bgcolor="#CCFFCC" 
|47||W||January 12, 2002||7–1 || align="left"|  Carolina Hurricanes (2001–02) ||19–23–4–1 || 
|- align="center" bgcolor="#CCFFCC" 
|48||W||January 15, 2002||5–2 || align="left"|  Pittsburgh Penguins (2001–02) ||20–23–4–1 || 
|- align="center" bgcolor="#FFBBBB"
|49||L||January 17, 2002||4–5 || align="left"| @ St. Louis Blues (2001–02) ||20–24–4–1 || 
|- align="center" bgcolor="#CCFFCC" 
|50||W||January 19, 2002||5–1 || align="left"| @ Washington Capitals (2001–02) ||21–24–4–1 || 
|- align="center" bgcolor="#CCFFCC" 
|51||W||January 21, 2002||7–5 || align="left"| @ Carolina Hurricanes (2001–02) ||22–24–4–1 || 
|- align="center" bgcolor="#CCFFCC" 
|52||W||January 23, 2002||4–2 || align="left"| @ Dallas Stars (2001–02) ||23–24–4–1 || 
|- align="center" bgcolor="#CCFFCC" 
|53||W||January 25, 2002||6–1 || align="left"|  Toronto Maple Leafs (2001–02) ||24–24–4–1 || 
|- align="center" bgcolor="#CCFFCC" 
|54||W||January 26, 2002||2–0 || align="left"| @ Calgary Flames (2001–02) ||25–24–4–1 || 
|- align="center" bgcolor="#CCFFCC" 
|55||W||January 28, 2002||5–1 || align="left"|  Nashville Predators (2001–02) ||26–24–4–1 || 
|- align="center" 
|56||T||January 30, 2002||2–2 OT|| align="left"|  Edmonton Oilers (2001–02) ||26–24–5–1 || 
|-

|- align="center" bgcolor="#CCFFCC" 
|57||W||February 4, 2002||4–2 || align="left"|  Phoenix Coyotes (2001–02) ||27–24–5–1 || 
|- align="center" bgcolor="#CCFFCC" 
|58||W||February 8, 2002||4–1 || align="left"| @ Calgary Flames (2001–02) ||28–24–5–1 || 
|- align="center" bgcolor="#FFBBBB"
|59||L||February 9, 2002||3–4 || align="left"|  Calgary Flames (2001–02) ||28–25–5–1 || 
|- align="center" bgcolor="#FF6F6F"
|60||OTL||February 12, 2002||1–2 OT|| align="left"|  Boston Bruins (2001–02) ||28–25–5–2 || 
|- align="center" 
|61||T||February 26, 2002||4–4 OT|| align="left"|  St. Louis Blues (2001–02) ||28–25–6–2 || 
|- align="center" bgcolor="#FF6F6F"
|62||OTL||February 28, 2002||3–4 OT|| align="left"|  Dallas Stars (2001–02) ||28–25–6–3 || 
|-

|- align="center" bgcolor="#CCFFCC" 
|63||W||March 2, 2002||6–3 || align="left"|  Minnesota Wild (2001–02) ||29–25–6–3 || 
|- align="center" bgcolor="#FFBBBB"
|64||L||March 7, 2002||1–6 || align="left"| @ Phoenix Coyotes (2001–02) ||29–26–6–3 || 
|- align="center" bgcolor="#FFBBBB"
|65||L||March 9, 2002||0–2 || align="left"| @ San Jose Sharks (2001–02) ||29–27–6–3 || 
|- align="center" bgcolor="#FFBBBB"
|66||L||March 10, 2002||4–7 || align="left"|  San Jose Sharks (2001–02) ||29–28–6–3 || 
|- align="center" bgcolor="#CCFFCC" 
|67||W||March 12, 2002||5–0 || align="left"| @ Nashville Predators (2001–02) ||30–28–6–3 || 
|- align="center" bgcolor="#CCFFCC" 
|68||W||March 14, 2002||5–1 || align="left"| @ Columbus Blue Jackets (2001–02) ||31–28–6–3 || 
|- align="center" bgcolor="#CCFFCC" 
|69||W||March 16, 2002||4–2 || align="left"| @ Atlanta Thrashers (2001–02) ||32–28–6–3 || 
|- align="center" bgcolor="#CCFFCC" 
|70||W||March 17, 2002||3–2 OT|| align="left"| @ New Jersey Devils (2001–02) ||33–28–6–3 || 
|- align="center" bgcolor="#CCFFCC" 
|71||W||March 19, 2002||3–1 || align="left"| @ New York Rangers (2001–02) ||34–28–6–3 || 
|- align="center" bgcolor="#FFBBBB"
|72||L||March 21, 2002||2–3 || align="left"| @ New York Islanders (2001–02) ||34–29–6–3 || 
|- align="center" bgcolor="#FFBBBB"
|73||L||March 24, 2002||0–2 || align="left"|  Edmonton Oilers (2001–02) ||34–30–6–3 || 
|- align="center" bgcolor="#CCFFCC" 
|74||W||March 26, 2002||4–0 || align="left"|  Los Angeles Kings (2001–02) ||35–30–6–3 || 
|- align="center" bgcolor="#CCFFCC" 
|75||W||March 28, 2002||4–3 OT|| align="left"|  Columbus Blue Jackets (2001–02) ||36–30–6–3 || 
|- align="center" bgcolor="#CCFFCC" 
|76||W||March 30, 2002||4–1 || align="left"|  Mighty Ducks of Anaheim (2001–02) ||37–30–6–3 || 
|-

|- align="center" 
|77||T||April 2, 2002||4–4 OT|| align="left"| @ Los Angeles Kings (2001–02) ||37–30–7–3 || 
|- align="center" bgcolor="#CCFFCC" 
|78||W||April 5, 2002||5–4 OT|| align="left"|  Minnesota Wild (2001–02) ||38–30–7–3 || 
|- align="center" bgcolor="#CCFFCC" 
|79||W||April 7, 2002||4–3 || align="left"|  Phoenix Coyotes (2001–02) ||39–30–7–3 || 
|- align="center" bgcolor="#CCFFCC" 
|80||W||April 9, 2002||2–1 || align="left"| @ Colorado Avalanche (2001–02) ||40–30–7–3 || 
|- align="center" bgcolor="#CCFFCC" 
|81||W||April 11, 2002||5–2 || align="left"|  Los Angeles Kings (2001–02) ||41–30–7–3 || 
|- align="center" bgcolor="#CCFFCC" 
|82||W||April 13, 2002||4–1 || align="left"| @ Calgary Flames (2001–02) ||42–30–7–3 || 
|-

|-
| Legend:

Playoffs

|- align="center" bgcolor="#CCFFCC" 
| 1 ||W|| April 17, 2002 || 4–3 OT|| align="left"| @ Detroit Red Wings || 20,058 || Canucks lead 1–0 || 
|- align="center" bgcolor="#CCFFCC"
| 2 ||W|| April 19, 2002 || 5–2 || align="left"| @ Detroit Red Wings || 20,058 || Canucks lead 2–0 || 
|- align="center" bgcolor="#FFBBBB"
| 3 ||L|| April 21, 2002 || 1–3 || align="left"| Detroit Red Wings || 18,422 || Canucks lead 2–1 || 
|- align="center" bgcolor="#FFBBBB"
| 4 ||L|| April 23, 2002 || 2–4 || align="left"| Detroit Red Wings || 18,422 || Series tied 2–2 || 
|- align="center" bgcolor="#FFBBBB"
| 5 ||L|| April 25, 2002 || 0–4 || align="left"| @ Detroit Red Wings || 20,058 || Red Wings lead 3–2 || 
|- align="center" bgcolor="#FFBBBB"
| 6 ||L|| April 27, 2002 || 4–6 || align="left"| Detroit Red Wings || 18,422 || Red Wings win 4–2 || 
|-

|-
| Legend:

Player statistics

Scoring
 Position abbreviations: C = Centre; D = Defence; G = Goaltender; LW = Left Wing; RW = Right Wing
  = Joined team via a transaction (e.g., trade, waivers, signing) during the season. Stats reflect time with the Canucks only.
  = Left team via a transaction (e.g., trade, waivers, release) during the season. Stats reflect time with the Canucks only.

Goaltending
  = Joined team via a transaction (e.g., trade, waivers, signing) during the season. Stats reflect time with the Canucks only.

Awards and records

Transactions
The Canucks were involved in the following transactions from June 10, 2001, the day after the deciding game of the 2001 Stanley Cup Finals, through June 13, 2002, the day of the deciding game of the 2002 Stanley Cup Finals.

Trades

Players acquired

Players lost

Signings

Draft picks
Vancouver's draft picks at the 2001 NHL Entry Draft held at the National Car Rental Center in Sunrise, Florida.

See also
2001–02 NHL season

Notes

References

Vancouver Canucks seasons
Vancouver C
Vancouver